= Founders' Pie Calculator =

The Founder's Pie Calculator is a tool for distributing shares when starting a business venture. It was first described in an article by Frank Demmler, who is an Adjunct Teaching Professor of Entrepreneurship at Carnegie Mellon University.

In contrast to popular notion, the shares are not distributed equally (because "it's fair") but using a system of 5 important aspects of any business venture, assigning a relative weight to them and then rating the founders in each of these aspects.
